The dinar (sign: DA; code: DZD) is the monetary currency of Algeria and it is subdivided into 100 centimes. Centimes are now obsolete due to their extremely low value.

Etymology
The name "dinar" is ultimately derived from the Roman denarius. The Arabic word santīm comes from the French "centime", since Algeria was under French occupation from 1830 to 1962.

History
The dinar was introduced on 1 April 1964, replacing the Algerian new franc at par.

Exchange rates
The official exchange rate set by the Central Bank of Algerian: Algerian Dinar to U.S. dollar is approximately د.ج138.26 per 1 US dollar.
The real exchange rate of the Algerian Dinar to U.S. dollar is approximately د.ج212 per 1 US dollar on black market.

Argotic counting system
The masses rarely use the dinar as such, but the franc (officially the centime; one hundredth of a dinar) and the doro (one twentieth of a dinar). In traditional selling places such as the vegetable market or in the case of street vendors, prices are displayed in francs, in more modern shops the prices are displayed in dinars but the franc is used in speech.

Coins
In 1964, coins in denominations of 1, 2, 5, 10, 20 and 50 centimes, and 1 dinar were introduced, with the 1, 2 and 5 centimes struck in aluminium, the 10, 20 and 50 centimes in aluminium bronze and the 1 dinar in cupro-nickel. The obverses showed the emblem of Algeria, while the reverses carried the values in Eastern Arabic numerals. In later decades, coins were issued sporadically with various commemorative subjects. However, the 1 and 2 centimes were not struck again, whilst the 5, 10 and 20 centimes were last struck in the 1980s.

A 200 dinar bi-metallic coin was issued in 2012 to commemorate Algeria's 50th anniversary of independence. The 10, 20, 50, 100, and 200 dinar coins are bimetallic.

Coins in general circulation are 5 dinars and higher. Following the massive inflation which accompanied the slow transition to a more capitalist economy during the late 1990s, the centime and fractional dinar coins have dropped out of general circulation, whilst the 1 and 2 dinar coins are rarely used, as prices are rounded to the nearest 5 dinars. Nonetheless, prices are typically quoted in centimes in colloquial speech; thus a price of 100 dinars is read as "ten thousand".

Banknotes
The "first series" of dinar banknotes issued in 1964 consisted of banknotes in denominations of 5, 10, 50 and 100 dinars. In 1970, 500 dinar banknotes were added, followed by 1000 dinars in 1992.

The 100 dinar note is being replaced by coins. 200, 500, and 1000 dinar notes are in circulation. The 1998 dated 500 and 1000 dinar notes have an additional vertical holographic strip on obverse.

See also
 Economy of Algeria
 Tunisian dinar
 Libyan dinar

References

 banknotenews.com
 
 
 Algerian Bank Regulations of 1996, for specifications of fourth series currency (French).

Economy of Algeria
Currencies of Algeria
Circulating currencies
Currencies introduced in 1964